Andrei Vasilyevich Nalyotov (born 31 March 1995) is a Russian football defender.

Club career
He made his Russian Football Premier League debut on 21 March 2015 for FC Arsenal Tula in a game against PFC CSKA Moscow.

He played for the main squad of FC Volga Nizhny Novgorod in the Russian Cup.

References

External links
 

1996 births
People from Domodedovo (town)
Living people
Russian footballers
Association football defenders
FC Volga Nizhny Novgorod players
Russian Premier League players
FC Arsenal Tula players
PFC CSKA Moscow players
Sportspeople from Moscow Oblast